Shield fern is a common name for ferns in several genera and may refer to:

Dryopteris
Lastreopsis
Polystichum

Dryopteridaceae